Mithun Tejasvi (born 16 December 1979) is an Indian actor who has acted in Kannada and Tamil language films.

Personal life
Mithun Tejasvi married Rohini, a software engineer, on 26 March 2006.

Filmography

Television

References

External links
 Mithun Tejasvi official website

1979 births
Living people
Male actors in Tamil cinema
Male actors in Kannada cinema
Indian male film actors
Tamil male television actors
21st-century Tamil male actors
People from Chikkamagaluru district
Male actors from Karnataka
20th-century Indian male actors